Zdislavice is a market town in Benešov District in the Central Bohemian Region of the Czech Republic. It has about 500 inhabitants.

Etymology
The name is derived from the personal name Zdislav, meaning "the village of Zdislav's people".

Geography
It lies in the Vlašim Uplands. The Štěpánovský Stream flows through the market town.

History
The first written mention of Zdislavice is from 1352. Until 1547, the village was part of the Vlašim estate and shared its owners. Knigh Petr of Újezd bought Zdislavice in 1547 and ruled the village for several years. After his rule, Zdislavice was bought by Václav Čejka of Olbramovice and became part of the Kácov estate. In this period, Zdislavice was promoted to a market town.

Sights
The landmark of Zdislavice is the Church of Saints Peter and Paul. The original church, first documented in 1355, was replaced by a new wooden church in 1645. However, this church was burned down in 1699. The current Baroque church was built in 1701–1702.

A unique monument is a small ossuary next to the church. It dates from the 18th century.

Gallery

References

External links

Populated places in Benešov District
Market towns in the Czech Republic